The Proceedings of the Natural Institute of Science (or PNIS) is a semi-satirical parody of a scientific journal that publishes articles in three categories: SOFD (Satirical or Fake Data), HARD (Honest And Reliable Data), and editorials. It was established in 2014 and the editor-in-chief is Matt J. Michel. The journal's editors have stated to Vox that articles published in PNIS-HARD are not peer-reviewed. However, they also maintained that the data in all such articles are entirely authentic.

References

External links 

Publications established in 2014
Open access journals